The  was an infantry division of the Imperial Japanese Army. It was formed on 1 May 1943 in Hubei province, simultaneously with the 62nd and 63rd divisions as a security (type C) division. The nucleus for the formation was the 12th from Chuzhou. As a security division, it lacked an artillery regiment. The men of the division were drafted from the Hiroshima mobilization district.

Action
On 10 July 1943, the 64th division was assigned to the 20th army. The division was then garrisoned in Yangzhou, Jiangbei District, Ningbo, Zhenjiang, and Wuxi. With the 11th army planning the Battle of Changsha in March 1944, the 64th division was reassigned to the Changsha area.

The 64th division started to participate in Operation Ichi-Go from October 1944. It was still in Changsha at the day of surrender of Japan, 15 August 1945.

The divisions was able to concentrate at headquarters from 6 September 1945. On 1 May 1946 evacuation started via the Yueyang - Wuchang - Hankou - Zhengzhou - Xuzhou - Nanjing route, finally arriving in Shanghai on 10 June 1946. On 20 June six parties sailed from Shanghai to Sasebo, and were demobilized on 15 July 1946. 79 men left Shanghai on 24 June 1946, and arrived at Kagoshima on 2 July to be immediately demobilized. The first large batch, the veterinary department and other auxiliaries, totalling 344 men, sailed from Shanghai on 25 June 1946, arriving at Sasebo on 26 June 1946, and at Fukuoka on 1 July 1946. That batch was demobilized on 6 July 1946.  On 1 July 1946, main divisional troops started to depart from Shanghai, and the last batch of 532 soldiers was demobilized in Uraga on 1 August 1946.

See also
 List of Japanese Infantry Divisions

Notes
This article incorporates material from Japanese Wikipedia page 第64師団 (日本軍), accessed 13 June 2016

Reference and further reading

 Madej, W. Victor. Japanese Armed Forces Order of Battle, 1937-1945 [2 vols]
Allentown, PA: 1981

Japanese World War II divisions
Infantry divisions of Japan
Military units and formations established in 1943
Military units and formations disestablished in 1946
1943 establishments in Japan
1946 disestablishments in Japan